The Jamieson River is an inland river in Victoria, Australia. The river rises in Alpine National Park and flows into the Goulburn River at the town of Jamieson. Its tributaries are Jamieson River north branch and Jamieson River south branch.

Recreation
The Jamieson has the blend of successive pools and runs, gravel beds, and varying water level and current. Easy accessibility in the lower course, combined with the significant brown trout, rainbow trout, small redfin and river blackfish populations make the Jamieson a great fishing river.

References

External links

Goulburn Broken catchment
Rivers of Hume (region)
Tributaries of the Goulburn River